William James (1542 – 12 May 1617) was an English academic and bishop.

Life
William James graduated with an MA degree at Christ Church, Oxford, in 1565. He was Master of University College, Oxford, in 1572, and Vice-Chancellor of the University of Oxford in 1581, and again in 1590. He became Dean of Christ Church in 1584.

James became Dean of Durham in 1596, where he was a witness to the decay of agriculture in northeast England. He was Bishop of Durham from 1606.

In early 1611, James had custody of Arbella Stuart, with the intention of the King to take her north to Durham. In the event, Arbella was moved from Lambeth to be confined at Barnet, while the bishop travelled north leaving Sir James Croft in charge, and for health reasons did not follow, being moved to East Barnet. When Arbella and her husband William Seymour, 2nd Duke of Somerset, (who was in the Tower of London) made simultaneous but badly coordinated escapes on 3 June 1611, she simply walked free.

References

1542 births
1617 deaths
People from Sandbach
Alumni of Christ Church, Oxford
16th-century English Anglican priests
17th-century Church of England bishops
Masters of University College, Oxford
Vice-Chancellors of the University of Oxford
Deans of Christ Church, Oxford
Bishops of Durham
Archdeacons of Coventry